Homer Ervin "Billy" Brewer (born November 8, 1934) is a former American football safety in the National Football League for the Washington Redskins.  He played college football at the University of Mississippi and was drafted in the 20th round of the 1959 NFL Draft.

1934 births
Living people
American football safeties
Ole Miss Rebels football players
People from Columbus, Mississippi
Washington Redskins players